"Mama Said Knock You Out" is a song by American rapper and actor LL Cool J, released in February 1991 as the fourth single from his fourth studio album of the same name (1990). The song famously begins with the line, "Don't call it a comeback/I been here for years." Before "Mama Said Knock You Out" was released, many people felt that LL Cool J's career was waning; his grandmother, who still believed in his talent, told him to "knock out" all his critics. The song was produced by Marley Marl with help from DJ Bobcat along with LL. The single reached number 17 on the Billboard Hot 100, was certified Platinum by the RIAA, and won the Grammy Award for Best Rap Solo Performance. The song takes various shots at Kool Moe Dee.

Background
The song uses samples from James Brown's "Funky Drummer", the Chicago Gangsters' "Gangster Boogie", Sly & The Family Stone's "Trip to Your Heart", the drum break from Sly & the Family Stone's Sing a Simple Song, and LL Cool J's own "Rock the Bells" (from his debut album Radio). The music video features LL Cool J in a boxing ring, rapping into the announcer's microphone. Intercut with this are clips of boxing matches and LL Cool J exercising.

LL Cool J said in his autobiography that the idea for the song came from a discussion with his grandmother. He had said to his grandmother that he felt that he couldn't survive as a rapper now that gangsta rap was popular and he was being dissed by several up-and-coming rappers. LL's grandmother responded, "Oh baby, just knock them out!" She is featured in the closing scene of the music video, saying "Todd! Todd! Get upstairs and take out that garbage."

Critical reception
Jon Wilde from Melody Maker said in his review of the single, "It is rather gratifying to see this arrogant, obnoxious young feller struggling hopelessly to resurrect his career. The Roy Kinnear of the rap scene returns with more of the same bilious rubbish. Nice hat though." David Quantick from NME wrote, "'Mama Said Knock You Out' demands that we "don't call it a comeback". I don't think we need go as far as that." Another editor, Paolo Hewitt, felt the track is "a vicious and exhilarating display of the man's talents."	David Fricke from Rolling Stone remarked that the rapper "obliges big time with producer Marley Marl's steely, stripped-back beats and his own verbal fisticuffs" on "the super-slammin'" track.

Legacy
Rolling Stone ranked the song 29th on a 2012 list of the "50 Greatest Hip Hop Songs of All Time".

Bob Dylan played it in the final slot of the "Mothers" episode of Season 1 of Theme Time Radio Hour in 2006. Dylan noted the song was "in the same tradition as the Dozens" and recited the first verse before playing it.

The animated film Kangaroo Jack: G'Day U.S.A.! featured a rendition of LL Cool J's single "Mama Said Knock You Out" during the dream boxing scene where Jackie Legs (voiced by Jeff Bennett) faces a heavyweight boxer named Killer Putulski (voiced by Keith Diamond).

Charts

Certifications

Five Finger Death Punch version

American heavy metal band Five Finger Death Punch covered the song for their fourth studio album, The Wrong Side of Heaven and the Righteous Side of Hell, Volume 1. The cover features rapper Tech N9ne. The single was released on March 25, 2014 by Prospect Park Records.

References

External links 

1991 singles
Grammy Award for Best Rap Solo Performance
LL Cool J songs
Songs written by LL Cool J
Def Jam Recordings singles
Columbia Records singles
1990 songs
Song recordings produced by Marley Marl
Diss tracks
Songs written by Bootsy Collins
Songs written by Marley Marl
Songs written by George Clinton (funk musician)
Songs written by Sly Stone
Songs written by Walter Morrison